"Magic Hour" is the eleventh single by the Liverpool britpop band Cast, fronted by ex La's bassist John Power. It was released in 1999. The song was the titletrack as well as the second and final single released from the namesake album. It peaked at number 28 on the UK singles chart spending only one week in the top 40.

Formats and track listings
CD single (1)
 "Magic Hour"
 "Gypsy Song"
 "I Never Wanna Lose You"

CD single (2)
 "Magic Hour"
 "Beat Mama" (Fire Island Classic Boy's Own mix)
 "What You Gonna Do?"

Tape single
 "Magic Hour"
 "Allbright"

Personnel
Cast
 John Power – vocals, guitar
 Peter Wilkinson – backing vocals, bass
 Liam "Skin" Tyson – guitar
 Keith O'Neill – drums

Production
 Gil Norton – producer, mixing
 Danton Supple – engineer, mixing

Additional musicians
 David Arnold – strings

Chart performance

References

1999 singles
Cast (band) songs
Songs written by John Power (musician)
Polydor Records singles
1999 songs
Song recordings produced by Gil Norton